"I Vow to Thee, My Country" is a British patriotic hymn, created in 1921, when music by Gustav Holst had a poem by Sir Cecil Spring Rice set to it. The music originated as a wordless melody, which Holst later named "Thaxted", taken from the "Jupiter" movement of Holst's 1917 suite The Planets.

History

The origin of the hymn's text is a poem by diplomat Sir Cecil Spring Rice, written in 1908 or 1912, entitled " ("The City of God") or "The Two Fatherlands".  The poem described how a Christian owes his loyalties to both his homeland and the heavenly kingdom. 

In 1908, Spring Rice was posted to the British Embassy in Stockholm. In 1912, he was appointed as Ambassador to the United States of America, where he influenced the administration of Woodrow Wilson to abandon neutrality and join Britain in the war against Germany. After the United States entered the war, he was recalled to Britain. Shortly before his departure from the US in January 1918, he re-wrote and renamed ", significantly altering the first verse to concentrate on the themes of love and sacrifice rather than "the noise of battle" and "the thunder of her guns", creating a more sombre tone in view of the loss of life suffered in the Great War. The first verse in both versions invoke Britain (in the 1912 version, anthropomorphised as Britannia with sword and shield; in the second version, simply called "my country"); the second verse, the Kingdom of Heaven.

According to Sir Cecil's granddaughter, the rewritten verse of 1918 was never intended to appear alongside the first verse of the original poem but was replacing it; the original first verse is nevertheless sometimes known as the "rarely sung middle verse". The text of the original poem was sent by Spring Rice to William Jennings Bryan in a letter shortly before his death in February 1918.

The poem circulated privately for a few years until it was set to music by Holst, to a tune he adapted from his Jupiter to fit the words of the poem. 
It was performed as a unison song with orchestra in the early 1920s, and it was finally published as a hymn in 1925/6 in the Songs of Praise hymnal (no. 188).

It was included in later hymnals, including:

Tune

In 1921, Gustav Holst adapted the music from a section of Jupiter from his suite The Planets to create a setting for the poem. The music was extended slightly to fit the final two lines of the first verse.  At the request of the publisher Curwen, Holst made a version as a unison song with orchestra (Curwen also published Sir Hubert Parry's unison song with orchestra, "Jerusalem"). This was probably first performed in 1921 and became a common element at Armistice memorial ceremonies, especially after it was published as a hymn in 1926.

In 1926, Holst harmonised the tune to make it usable as a hymn, which was included in the hymnal Songs of Praise. In that version, the lyrics were unchanged, but the tune was then called "Thaxted" (named after the village where Holst lived for many years). The editor of the new (1926) edition of Songs of Praise was Holst's close friend Ralph Vaughan Williams, which may have provided the stimulus for Holst's co-operation in producing the hymn.

Holst's daughter Imogen recorded that, at "the time when he was asked to set these words to music, Holst was so over-worked and over-weary that he felt relieved to discover they 'fitted' the tune from Jupiter".

Lyrics
The hymn as printed in Songs of Praise (1925) consisted only of the two stanzas of the 1918 version, credited  "Words: Cecil Spring-Rice, 1918; Music: Thaxted", as follows:

The final line of the second stanza is based on Proverbs , "Her ways are ways of pleasantness, and all her paths are peace"  (KJV), in the context of which the feminine pronoun refers to Wisdom.

The original first stanza of Spring-Rice's poem "Urbs Dei/"The Two Father Lands" (1908–1912), never set to music, was as follows:

Contemporary use

First performed in 1921, it is still associated with Remembrance Day services all over the Commonwealth of Nations.

 The hymn was used at the funeral of Winston Churchill in 1965.
 Diana, Princess of Wales, requested that the hymn be sung at her wedding to Prince Charles in 1981, saying that it had "always been a favourite since schooldays". It was also sung at her funeral in 1997 and her tenth-year memorial service in 2007. 
 It was sung at the funeral of Baroness Thatcher on 17 April 2013. 
The first verse of Alfie Boe's recording of the song was played during Captain Sir Tom Moore's funeral on 27 February 2021.
 It is the school hymn of St Paul's Girls' School (where Holst taught) and several other schools.

In popular culture
The hymn is sung in The Crown, Season 1, Episode 1 (2016), as Winston Churchill enters Westminster Abbey for the wedding of Princess Elizabeth and Philip Mountbatten. 
Julian Mitchell's 1981 play Another Country and its 1984 film version derive their titles from the words of the second stanza.
An arrangement of the hymn composed by Johan Söderqvist and Patrik Andrén was included as a part of the official soundtrack for Battlefield V.

Reception
In August 2004, Stephen Lowe, Bishop of Hulme criticised the hymn in a diocese newsletter, calling it "heretical" because of its nationalist overtones.

"I Vow to Thee, My Country" was voted as the UK's sixth favourite hymn in a 2019 poll by the BBC's Songs of Praise.

References

External links
 I Vow to Thee, My Country  at CyberHymnal.
 I Vow to Thee, My Country at Hymnary.org.
Libera (choir):
I Vow to Thee, my country (Angel Voices. Libera in concert; music; concert in Leiden-2007); Libera Official, 2016 (Youtube).
I vow to Thee, my country (video; concert in Leiden-2007). Youtube, 2008.
I vow to Thee, my country (Free; music); Libera Official, 2014 (Youtube)

1921 songs
British patriotic songs
Compositions by Gustav Holst
English Christian hymns
20th-century hymns